CJVM-FM, is a Manitoba radio station which broadcasts a country, rock, pop and oldies format on the frequency 103.3 FM in Virden, Manitoba, Canada.

Owned by 5777152 Manitoba Ltd. which is wholly owned and controlled by Mr. William Gade, the station received CRTC on October 14, 2010.

The station launched on September 4, 2014 at 6AM with full programming.

References

External links
CJVM-FM website
 

JVM
Radio stations established in 2014
2014 establishments in Manitoba